Jules Leroy (Ablis, 1903 – Chaptal, 1979) was a French priest and researcher in the domains of Syriac, Coptic and Ethiopian manuscripts, art and architecture.

As a novice he joined the French Benedictine congregation of Solesmes in their exile on the Isle of Wight. From 1930 to 1933 Leroy studied at the Pontificio Istituto Biblico in Rome.

Leroy's early researches in iconography of Pre-Chalcedonian Christian churches were guided by Henri Seyrig in the Lebanon and by the historian of art, André Grabar. A researcher in the French Centre National de Recherche Scientifique, Leroy was attached to the Institut d' Etudes et de Recherches d' Ethiopie in Addis Ababa.

Sources
 René-Georges Coquin, Necrologie, Syria, Vol. 57 (1980), p. 502-503.
 Palmer, A.N. and Ginkel, J., 'Leroy, Jules' in Dictionary of Art 19 (1996), p. 231-232.

 Selected publications
 Les Manuscrits Syriaques à peinture conservés dans les Bibliothèques d'Europe et d' Orient. Contribution à l' étude et à l' iconographie des églises de langue syriaque, Geuthner, 1964.
 Ethiopie, archéologie et culture, Desclée de Brouwer, 1973.

1903 births
1979 deaths
20th-century French Roman Catholic priests
French art historians
20th-century French historians
French male non-fiction writers
20th-century French male writers